The 1959 Kamchatka earthquake occurred on May 4 at  with a moment magnitude of 8.0–8.3, and a surface wave magnitude of 8.25. The epicenter was near the Kamchatka Peninsula, Russian SFSR, USSR. Building damage was reported in Petropavlovsk-Kamchatsky. The maximum intensity was VIII (Damaging) on the Medvedev–Sponheuer–Karnik scale. The intensity in Petropavlovsk-Kamchatsky was about VIII MSK.

Subduction is active along about the southern half of the eastern coast of Kamchatka Peninsula, between its junctions with the Aleutian Islands and the Kuril Islands.

Tectonic setting
Kamchatka lies near a large convergent boundary—the Kuril-Kamchatka Trench—which accommodates the subduction of the Pacific Plate under the Okhotsk Plate (a microplate within the North American Plate). Subduction occurs at a rate of /yr at the trench, increasing from north to south. This subduction zone generates Kamchatka earthquakes and their associated tsunamis. This subduction zone is associated with many large events throughout history, including earthquakes in 1737, 1841, 1923, and 1952. The 1923 earthquake was also quite strong, measuring  8.5. The 1952 event was the most recent of the great earthquakes ( 8.5+) along the Kuril-Kamchatka trench, and measured  9.0.

Earthquake
The earthquake struck at 7:15 UTC, or 19:15 local time on May 4th, 1959. This event nucleated near where the 1952 earthquake ruptured with the most slip, and just south of the 1923 earthquake. The maximum intensity on the Medvedev–Sponheuer–Karnik scale (MSK) was VIII (Damaging), and maximum felt intensities in Petropavlovsk-Kamchatsky were also MSK VIII.

Tsunami
The tsunami was small, which was expected for the size of the earthquake. Readings of  run-ups in Hawaii were reported as well.

See also
List of earthquakes in 1959
List of earthquakes in Russia

References

Sources

External links

Kamchatka earthquake, 1959
May 1959 events in Asia
Megathrust earthquakes in the Soviet Union
1959 in the Soviet Union
Earthquakes in the Russian Far East
Kamchatka
History of the Kamchatka Peninsula